Skiddy's Almshouse is the oldest inhabited building in the city of Cork. It was built in 1718 and finished in 1719.

It was the second almshouse built using a bequest from Stephen Skiddy for the city's poor, either Catholic or Church of Ireland. The first building, located near North Gate Bridge, was replaced by the end of 1718 following complaints of its being a poor source for fresh air and being too narrow. Skiddy was a wealthy Cork-born wine merchant, who in his will of 1584 bequeathed an annual payment for the benefit of his Almshouse. This annual payment began when Skiddy's wife died in 1606. The payment is made to this day by The Vintners Federation in London to Skiddy's charity.  The Almshouse was also funded by Roger Bettridge when he included it in his will in 1717.

The Almshouse was built on a corner of the medieval Saint Mary's Churchyard, the building was once part of a campus including the Green Coat Hospital and School. The other buildings were demolished in the 1950s. The Almshouse was saved from demolition by the Cork Preservation Society in the 1960s with an award-winning restoration completed in 1975 by the architect Frank Murphy. In 2000, the CPS Sold the Almshouse to the Social Housing Development Company. This restoration, which saw Murphy (as architect) win an RIAI Europa Nostra award, was followed by a second restoration which completed in 2005.    Skiddy's Almshouse is now one of the very few surviving eighteenth-century institutional buildings in Cork.

The Almshouse is an L-shaped building with a stone arcade enclosed by a ten-foot wall with a large iron gate. As of 2011, it housed 15 people.

Further reading
 
 
 
 The History of Skiddy's Almshouse MPhil. Thesis 2004 by Angela O'Donnell is available to read in Cork City's public libraries
 Vintners' Company, Some Notes on the History of the Vintners' Company (London, 2001)
 Vintners' Company, Will Book (Guildhall Library MS 15364, pp. 69–74)
 Vintners' Company, Receipts for Mr. Stephen Skidmore Legacy from October 1606 – 1665 (Guildhall Library MS 15361, FCAA/61)
 John Crowley, Robert Devoy, Denis Linehan, Patrick O'Flanagan, Atlas of Cork city. Cork University Press, Cork 2005, pp. 144–5.
 Michael V. Conlon, 'Some old Cork charities', in Journal of Cork Historical and Archaeological Society. Cork Historical and Archaeological Society, Cork, 1943
 John Crowley, Robert Devoy, Denis Linehan, Patrick O'Flanagan, Atlas of Cork city. Cork University Press, Cork 2005.
"Cork Past and Present .Ie." Skiddy's Almshouse | Cork Past & Present, http://www.corkpastandpresent.ie/places/shandon/historicbuildingsintheshandonarea/skiddysalmshouse/.
Virtualbuilder Follow. "Skiddy's Almshouse 3D Model." Sketchfab, 1 Jan. 1964, https://sketchfab.com/3d-models/skiddys-almshouse-d8Qd4Kl6xueBnrUw3F8r6jdO8WC.

References

National Monuments in County Cork
Buildings and structures in Cork (city)
1719 establishments in Ireland
Almshouses in Ireland